Hoseynabad-e Nazer (also Romanized as Ḩoseynābād-e Nāz̧er) is a village in Fazl Rural District, in the Central District of Nishapur County, Razavi Khorasan Province, Iran. At the 2006 census, its population was 197, in 63 families.

References 

Populated places in Nishapur County